Zuarungu is a town in the Upper East Region of Ghana east of Bolgatanga. The village is the capital of the Bolgatanga East District. The people living in Zuarungu are part of the Frafra-Tribe so additionally to speaking English many of them can also speak Frafra

Communities of Zuarungu 

 Yarigabisi
 Agric
 Kumbosku
 Daboren
 Dulugu
 Kantia
 Zonno
 Sarkoote
 Nyorkoko
 Kantaga
 Benkute
 Kunkoa
 Zuarungu-Dakio
 Zuarungu-Dubila
 Zuarungu-Moshie

Markets 
Zuarungu holds one main market. This one is called Tu'an (Frafra for Baobab Tree) and is named after a Baobab tree that used to stand there when the marked was founded. Tu'an is found around the eastern end of the DVLA Road in Zuarungu.

Additionally, there is the Timber Market which is located north of N11 in Yarigabisi. Although this market is mainly for wood you can also buy many other things there.

There are also some smaller markets around Zuarungu:
 Puskan (Zonno)
 Beat and Boot Market (Kumbosku)

Education 

 Nurse and Midwifery Training College Zuarungu
 Zuarungu Senior High School

Geologische Besonderheiten

Dams 

Many of the communities of Zuarungu have their own dams which are mainly used for agriculture. During the dry season the water is used by cattle to drink and also to water plants to make farming possible while no rain is falling.

Zonno-Zori 

Zonno-Zori (locally also Zonzori) is a hill chain east of Zuarungu near the communities of Zonno and Nyorkoko. It is formed by four main hills and many smaller hills. None of the hills of Zonzori has a name. The maximum elevation of the hills is 348 m. Zori is Frafra and can be translated as mountain or rock.

References

Populated places in the Upper East Region